Orlić is a Serbo-Croatian surname, derived from the word orao, meaning "eagle". It may refer to:

Mila Orlić, Croatian historian and co-author of Boris Pahor
Milan Orlić, Serbian poet, prose writer and essayist 
Mirko Orlić, Croatian scientist
Slobodan Orlić, Serbian politician
Tihomir "Tiho" Orlić, Croatian musician
Vladimir Orlić, Serbian politician
Vlaho Orlić, Yugoslav water polo player and manager

See also
Orlović and Orlić families

References 

Serbian surnames
Croatian surnames